Grapholita tenebrosana, the Grapholitha roseticolana, is a moth of the  family Tortricidae. It was described by Philogène Auguste Joseph Duponchel in 1843. It is found from most of Europe east to Japan. The habitat consists of woodland, gardens, orchards, parks and scrubs.

The wingspan is 11–14 mm. The palpi are whitish. The forewings are dark purplish -fuscous.The costa has  indistinct silvery-whitish strigulae posteriorly. Three or four black dots are transversely placed in the ocellus. The hindwings are fuscous, darker posteriorly. The larva is flesh-coloured or pinkish-white ; head and plate of 2 brownish ochreous.

Adults are on wing from June to July.

References

Moths described in 1843
Grapholitini
Moths of Europe
Moths of Asia